CEAT may refer to:  
 CEAT Limited, is a tire manufacturing company based in Mumbai, India.
 UPLB College of Engineering and Agro-Industrial Technology, is one of the eleven degree-granting units of the University of the Philippines at Los Baños.